Asperopilum is a genus of fungi within the Hyaloscyphaceae family. This is a monotypic genus, containing the single species Asperopilum juncicola.

References

External links
Asperopilum at Index Fungorum

Hyaloscyphaceae
Monotypic Leotiomycetes genera